When the Spanish arrived, they divided Peru into three main regions: the coastal region (11.6% of Peru), that is bounded by the Pacific Ocean; the highlands (28.1% of Peru), that is located on the Andean Heights, and the jungle, that is located on the Amazonian Jungle (Climate of Peru). But Javier Pulgar Vidal (es), a geographer who studied the biogeographic reality of the Peruvian territory for a long time, proposed the creation of eight Natural Regions. In 1941, he presented his thesis "Las Ocho Regiones Naturales del Perú" at the III General Assembly of the Pan-American Institute of Geography and History.

These eight Peruvian regions are:
 Chala or Coast (subtropical dry and tropical savanna)
 Yungas
 Fluvial Yunga
 Loma-Vegetation
 Quechua
 Suni or Jalca
 Puna
 Janca
 Rupa - Rupa or Highland Jungle
 Omagua or Lowland Jungle

Example: Andes 10°S 
See also Altitudinal zonation

Classic version, Amazonic side 

 Sea level
 Estimated 22 - 24°C (75°F), but the cold Humboldt Current generates fog on the coast side
 Tierra caliente (Hot land, tropical) up to 2,500 ft (about 750 m - 1,000 m).
 Crops: Cacao, Banana, Sugarcane, Manioc, Sweet Potatoes, Yams.
 Tierra templada (Temperate land, subtropical) up to 6,000 ft (about 1,850 m – 2,000 m)
 The warmest month has an average temperature of below 22°C or 72°F. 
 Crops: Coffee, Tobacco, Maize, Coca, Peruvian Pepper (Schinus molle), Avocado, Guave (Psidium guajava), Cherimoya, Plum, Citrus fruits. 
 Tierra fría (Cool land, temperate) below 12,000 ft (about 3,600 m, treeline)
 The warmest month has an average temperature of below 18°C or 64°F. 
 Crops: Potato, Maize, Squash, Passionfruit, Papaya, Peach, Wheat, Rye, and Barley. Farming of cattle. 
 Tierra helada (Cold land) above 12,000 ft (about 3,600 m)
 The definition of treeline of Coniferae: the warmest month has an average temperature of below 10°C or 50°F ). 
 Crops above tree line: Quinoa, Cañigua, Mashua, Oca, Tarhui, Broad beans and Ulluco. Farming of Sheep, Llamas and Alpacas. 
 Terrestrial Biome Type 10: Montane grasslands and shrublands
 Tierra Nevada (Janca), above the snow line, 15,000 ft (about 4,500 m - 5,000 m)
 Just warmer than -1°C over rocks or just warmer than -3°C over snow, annual mean temperature).

Javier Pulgar Vidal's version 

The Peruvian geographer Javier Pulgar Vidal divided Peru in 8 regions (traditionally, it was costa, sierra and selva):

Map from República del Perú - Instituto Geográfico Nacional

Chala (West, Pacific Coast) 0– 500 m
Omagua (Lowland jungle or Selva baja, Amazonic rainforest) 80– 400 m
Rupa-Rupa (Highland jungle, Selva alta) 400– 1,000 m
Yungas (Aymaran for "Warm Lands", Cloud forest)
Loma-Vegetation (West, "Yunga coastal" at the north of Peru) 450– 600 m
Fluvial Yungas (East, "Yunga fluvial") 1,000- 2,300 m
Quechua (East, High valleys) 2,300– 3,500 m
Suni (or Jalca or Sallqa too, high plateaus and cliffs) 3,500– 4,100 m
Puna (means "mountain top") 4,100– 4,800 m
Janca (means white) above 4,800 m, permafrost, rocks, snow and ice

Notes 

 Biomes & Ecoregions nearby:

Tropical and subtropical moist broadleaf forests 

Bolivian Yungas
Peruvian Yungas
Southwest Amazon moist forests

Montane grasslands and shrublands 

Central Andean dry puna
Central Andean puna
Central Andean wet puna

Deserts and xeric shrublands 
Atacama Desert
Sechura Desert

Overview - Amazonic side 

 Mouth of the Amazon River, Atlantic Ocean
 Belém, Brazil, 24 m, annual mean temperature 26.0°C
 Gurupa várzea (NT0126)
 Manaus, Brazil, 72 m, annual mean temperature 26.6°C
 Monte Alegre várzea (NT0141)
 Purus várzea (NT0156)
 Colombia - Peru - Brazil border
 Leticia, Colombia, 84 m, annual mean temperature 25.8°C
 Tierra Caliente or Tropical rainforest
 Omagua or Selva baja (Southwest Amazon moist forests - NT0166)
 Iquitos, Peru, 126 m, annual mean temperature 26.2°C
 Rupa-Rupa or Selva alta (Iquitos várzea - NT0128)
 Yunga fluvial (more than 5°C colder than the Peruan Tropics)
 Peruvian Yungas (NT0153)
 Quechua (High valleys, more than 10°C colder than the Peruan Tropics)
 Tree line
 Tierra Helada
 Suni (plateau)
 Mountain pass
 Puna (mountain slope)
 Central Andean wet puna (NT1003)
 Central Andean puna (NT1002)
 "Andean-Alpine desert"
 Snow line
 Tierra Nevada or Janca
 Peak

Estimated temperatures - Continental Divide 

Explanations:
 Region, elevation (m); avg annual precipitation (mm); avg annual temperature (°C);
 Peruvian Highland Rainforest (Tropical climate), Cloud forest (Subtropical climate) and Temperate forest (Temperate climate);
 Cusco reference, estimated avg annual temperature (°C, Lowland Rainforest or Selva baja gets more rain, so it is more cloudy, so it is cooler);
 Snow line reference, Humboldt cold current/ Pacific climate influence, estimated avg annual temperature (°C).
 Cuzco, Peru; 3,249 m; avg annual temperature 12.5 °C; avg annual precipitation 736 mm.
 Lima, Peru; 30 m; avg annual temperature 19.2 °C (fog influence); avg annual precipitation 15 mm.

Example: Kallawaya Region, Bolivia 

Altitudinal zonation: Kallawaya Region, around Charazani, Bolivia (border to Peru). 

 Glacier
 Elevation: 5,900- 5,200 m, Annual mean temperature: below 0 °C, Agriculture: none
 High Mountain Desert, Werneria ciliolata on scree
 Elevation: 5,200- 5,000 m, Annual mean temperature: below 0 °C - 0 °C, Agriculture: none.
 Grass Zone
 Calamagrostis minima Steppe,
Elevation: 5,000- 4,600 m, Annual mean temperature: 0- 3.5 °C, Farming: alpacas, lamas.
 Pycnophyllum Steppe,
Elevation: 4,600- 4,300 m, Annual mean temperature: 3.5- 7.5 °C, Farming: alpacas, lamas.
 Aciachne Humid Grassland,
Elevation: 4,300- 3,900 m, Annual mean temperature: 7.5- 10.0 °C, Farming: alpacas, lamas, pigs; Agriculture: bitter potatoes, (oca), (oat); Fallow land: more than 8 years.
 Shrub Zone Satureja Shrub (westslope), Baccharis pentandii Shrub, with Berberis (eastslope),
Elevation: 3,900- 3,600 m, Annual mean temperature: 10.0- 11.5 °C, Farming: sheep; Agriculture: potatoes, oca, ulluco, barley; Fallow land: 3 to 4 years.
 Mutisia Shrub (westslope), Baccharis pentlandii Shrub, with Siphocampylus (eastslope),
Elevation: 3,600- 2,700 m, Annual mean temperature: 11.5- 16.5 °C, Farming: sheep, cattle; Agriculture: wheat, (barley), peas, beans, maize up to 3,500 m with crop rotation.
 Kaunia longipetiolata Shrub,
Elevation: 3,200- 2,700 m, Annual mean temperature: 13.5- 16.5 °C, Farming: cattle; Agriculture: maize, wheat, beans, spring potatoes, use of fertilizers, no crop rotation.
 Highland Rainforest,
Elevation: below 2,700 m, Annual mean temperature: over 17.0 °C, Farming: cattle; Agriculture: tropical fruits, oranges, coffee, coca at around 2,000 m.

Gallery

See also 
 Climate of Peru
 
 Geography of Peru
 Altitudinal zonation

References 

 
Climatic and glaciological subregions of the Andes
Ecology of the Andes
Ecoregions of the Andes

Peru geography-related lists
Montane ecology
Natural history of Peru
Natural regions of South America
Tropical Andes

ca:Geografia del Perú